The 1958 Brown Bears football team was an American football team that represented Brown University as a member of the Ivy League during the 1958 NCAA University Division football season. 

In their eighth and final season under head coach Alva Kelley, the Bears compiled a 6–3 record and outscored opponents 211 to 140. Don Warburton was the team captain.  

The Bears' 4–3 conference record tied for fourth place in the Ivy League. They outscored Ivy opponents 136 to 128. 

Brown played its home games at Brown Stadium in Providence, Rhode Island.

Schedule

References

Brown
Brown Bears football seasons
Brown Bears football